Alec J. M. Gray was a British socialist.

A railway clerk, Gray is believed to have been a member of the Independent Labour Party before helping found the Socialist Party of Great Britain in June 1904.  Gray was a writer of some note for the Socialist Standard until 1908, served on the executive committee (1904–1905, 1907–1911) and was the Party's second Treasurer (1905–1907).

References

Socialist Party of Great Britain 1904–1913 membership register

Socialist Party of Great Britain members
Independent Labour Party politicians
19th-century births
20th-century deaths